Parviz Kazemi is an Iranian politician and former Minister of Welfare and Social Security in the first cabinet of Mahmoud Ahmadinejad. He was proposed by Ahmadinejad to parliament in August 2005 but has resigned after one year.

References

External links

1958 births
Living people
People from Tehran
Government ministers of Iran